Austromola angerhoferi is an extinct species of ocean sunfish. It is known from the Lower Miocene Ebelsberg Formation near Pucking, Austria.

References

Molidae